The 2022 FIA Motorsport Games Touring Car Cup was the second FIA Motorsport Games Touring Car Cup, held at Circuit Paul Ricard, France on 26 October to 30 October 2022. The race was contested with TCR Touring Car spec cars. The event was part of the 2022 FIA Motorsport Games.

Entry list

References

External links

Touring Car Cup
Touring car races
2022 in TCR Series